Andahuasi (BVL: ANDAHUAC1) is a Peruvian company primarily engaged in the agriculture sector.

The company specializes in the cultivation and processing of sugarcane and fruit, such as apples, papayas, pineapples and others. It commercializes and exports such products as sugar, molasses, bagasse, alcohol, liquors and other sugar derivates. In addition the company is involved in the livestock farming.

The main shareholders of the company are Industrial Andahuasi and Ducktown Holdings with 30.69% and 10.07% stake respectively.

Sugar companies
Agriculture companies of Peru
Companies based in Lima